Schloss Aigen is a castle located in Aigen, a quarter of Salzburg, Salzburgerland, Austria. The structure also includes a church and a park.

History
The castle was built in 1402. The park was an English style park made in 1780.

Castles in Salzburg

During the Hungarian Revolution, in 1956, some of the refugees were processed through Salzburg. Schloß Aigen was rented by the U.S. Consulate in Salzburg and became apartments for the State Department staff.